Wael El-Quabbani وائل القباني (born 2 September 1976 in Egypt) is an Egyptian football player. He is a defender for Itesalat Club.

Milestones

International Caps: 7
Participated in African Cup of Nations 2004

Previous Club
Aswan (Egypt)

Titles as a player

11 For Zamalek
3 Egyptian League titles (2000/2001 & 2002/2003 & 2003/2004)
2 Egyptian Super Cup (2000/2001 & 2001/2002)
1 Egyptian Cup Titles (2001/2002)
1 African Cup Winners' Cup title (2000)
1 African Champions League title (2002)
1 African Super Cup title (2002)
1 Arab Club Championship Title (2003)
1 Egyptian Saudi Super Cup (2003)

External links

1976 births
Living people
Egyptian footballers
Egypt international footballers
Zamalek SC players
2004 African Cup of Nations players
Egyptian Premier League players
Association football defenders